KZHT (97.1 FM) is a Top 40 (CHR) formatted radio station broadcasting to the Salt Lake City metropolitan area. It is owned by iHeartMedia as one of six radio stations in this market.  The station's studios are located in West Valley City and its transmitter site is located southwest of the city on Farnsworth Peak in the Oquirrh Mountains.

Station history

Beautiful music (1961-198?) 
The station signed on in 1961 as KLUB-FM, airing a beautiful music format that was partially simulcasted with KLUB-AM.

Adult contemporary (198?-2000) 
The station then became KISN "Kissin 97", airing an adult contemporary format.

'80s hits (2000-2003) 
On November 3, 2000, the station changed to an All-80s Hits format. It retained the "Kissin 97" name and airstaff.  In 2001, KISN and at least four other Clear Channel stations in the U.S. aired the program Martha Quinn's Rewind.

Top 40 (2003-present) 
On December 22, 2003, 97.1 became the new home of KZHT and its top 40 format. KZHT and KISN owner  Clear Channel opted to sell the limited-coverage 94.9 frequency.

References

External links
KZHT official website

ZHT
Contemporary hit radio stations in the United States
Radio stations established in 1961
1961 establishments in Utah
IHeartMedia radio stations